Mac OS Gaelic is a character encoding created for the Irish Gaelic language, based on the Welsh Mac OS Celtic encoding but replacing 23 characters with Gaelic characters. It was developed by Michael Everson, and was in his CeltScript fonts and on some fonts included with the Irish localization of Mac OS 6.0.8 and 7.1 and on.

Like ISO 8859-14, this codepage represents the Irish Gaelic and Welsh languages.

Layout 

 Before Mac OS 8.5, 0x26 mapped to both & (ampersand) and ⁊ (Tironian et, Unicode character U+20A4), which were unified.
 Before Mac OS 8.5, the character 0xDB mapped to currency sign (¤), Unicode character U+00A4.
 Before Mac OS 8.5, the character 0xE4 mapped to ‰, Unicode character U+2030.
 Before Unicode 4.1, the character 0xF0 mapped to ♣ Unicode character U+2663.

References 

Character sets
Gaelic
Articles with unsupported PUA characters
Gaelic